Rock Me Tonight is the platinum selling 1985 debut album from American R&B/Soul singer Freddie Jackson. Released on April 28, 1985, the album yielded four top–10 singles on the U.S. R&B chart, with the first two, "You Are My Lady" and "Rock Me Tonight (For Old Times Sake)", reaching number one. The latter two, "Love Is Just a Touch Away" and "He'll Never Love You", peaked at Nos. 9 and 8, respectively. The album contains a cover of the Billie Holiday classic "Good Morning Heartache". The success of Rock Me Tonight garnered Jackson a Grammy Award nomination in 1986 for Best New Artist, losing out to Sade.  Rock Me Tonight went on to top the R&B Albums chart for 14 nonconsecutive weeks, and peaked inside the Top 10 on the Billboard 200.

Track listing
"He'll Never Love You (Like I Do)" (Keith Diamond, Barry Eastmond) – 4:43
"Love Is Just a Touch Away" (Freddie Jackson, Barry Eastmond) – 5:19
"I Wanna Say I Love You" (Freddie Jackson, Barry Eastmond) – 4:40
"You Are My Lady" (Barry Eastmond) – 4:44
"Rock Me Tonight (For Old Times Sake)" (Paul Laurence) – 7:12
"Sing a Song of Love" (Barry Eastmond) – 5:02
"Calling" (Keith Diamond, Barry Eastmond) – 5:30
"Good Morning Heartache" (Ervin Drake, Dan Fisher, Irene Higginbotham) – 4:28

Personnel
 Freddie Jackson – lead vocals, backing vocals
 Barry Eastmond – keyboards, synthesizers, Roland TR-808 drum programming
 Eric Rehl – synthesizers
 Paul Laurence – keyboards (5), Kurzweil synthesizer (5), Yamaha DX7 (4-5), Oberheim DMX drum programming (4-5), backing vocals (5)
 Robert Aries – keyboards (8), Kurzweil synthesizer (8), drum programming (8)
 Ira Siegel – acoustic guitar, guitar
 Fareed Abdul-Haqq – guitar
 Clarence Brice – guitar
 Mike "Dino" Campbell – guitar
 Thomas J. Flammia – guitar
 Wayne Brathwaite – bass
 Timmy Allen – bass (5)
 Bernard Davis – drums
 Richard Rodriguez – drums
 Joel Rosenblatt – drums
 Terry Silverlight – drums
 Buddy Williams – drums
 Bashiri Johnson – percussion
 Steve Kroon – percussion
 V. Jeffrey Smith – saxophone
 Stanley Turrentine – sax solo (5)
 Janice Dempsey – backing vocals
 Dolly Eastmond – backing vocals
 Danny Madden – backing vocals
 Cindy Mizelle – backing vocals
 Melba Moore – backing vocals
 B.J. Nelson – backing vocals
 Lillo Thomas – backing vocals
 Audrey Wheeler – backing vocals
 Reggie King – backing vocals (5)

Production
 Producers – Barry Eastmond (Tracks 1-4, 6 & 7); Paul Laurence (Track 5); Robert Aries (Track 8).
 Executive Producers – Beau Huggins and Varnell Johnson
 Production Coordination – Zack Vaz
 Engineers – Ron Banks (Tracks 1-4, 6 & 7); Carl Beatty and Steve Goldman (Track 5); Frank Heller, Peter Robbins and Bob Rose (Track 8).
 Second Engineer – Joe Marno (Track 5)
 Assistant Engineers – Dean Cochren, Larry DeCarmine, Cathy Goode, Frank Heller and Kurt Upper (Tracks 1-4, 6 & 7); Mike Nicolette (Track 8).
 Track 5 mixed by Steve Goldman at Right Track Recording (New York, NY).
 Track 8 mixed by Peter Robbins at Unique Recording Studios.
 Mastered by Jack Skinner at Sterling Sound (New York, NY) and Eddy Schreyer at Capitol Mastering (Hollywood, CA).
 Art Direction – Roy Kohara
 Design – Roland Young
 Photography – Chris Callis
 Administrator – Anne Thomas
 Management – Hush Productions

Charts

Weekly charts

Year-end charts

Singles

See also
 List of number-one R&B albums of 1985 (U.S.)

References

External links
Rock Me Tonight at Discogs

1985 debut albums
Freddie Jackson albums
Capitol Records albums